Stroll, along with Stomp, are the seventh and eighth studio albums by the Boston ska punk band Big D and the Kids Table, released simultaneously on June 11, 2013 by Strictly Rude Records.

Dedicated to the memory of Martin Richard, Krystle Campbell, Lingzi Lu, Sean Collier and the many wounded at 2013 Boston Marathon bombing.

Track listing
 "Knife" - 6:02
 "Young Suckers" - 2:45
 "Put It in a Song" - 4:14
 "Lynn, Lynn the City of Sin" - 2:59
 "Main Squeeze" - 2:53
 "What I Got" - 2:32
 "I'm Just an Idea" - 4:09
 "Spit That Champagne Out" - 2:48
 "Tell Me Why" - 3:44
 "Moment of Weakness" - 3:35
 "Drink Me Down" - 2:52
 "Our 1st Day" - 3:20
 "Trust in Music" - 7:45
 "Better Off Insane"- digital only bonus track

Personnel
David McWane – Vocals, Dubs, Guitar, Foot Stomps, Tambourine
Alex Stern - Guitar, Piano, Organ, Mandolin, Vocals
Derek Davis - Drums, Tambourine, Shaker
Ryan O'Connor - Tenor, Saxophone, Vocals
Stephen Foote - Bass Guitar
Brie Finn - Vocals, Claps
Erin MacKenzie - Vocals, Claps
Sirae Richardson - Vocals, Claps
Rich Stein - Percussion
Billy Kottage - Trombone
Nate Leskovic - Trombone
Matthew Giorgio - Trumpet
Dan Stoppelman - Trumpet
Paul E. Cutler - Trombone
Logan La Barbera - Trombone
Andy Bergman - Baritone Saxophone
Coolie Ranx - Vocals (Courtesy of the Pilfers)
Casey Gruttadauria - Organ, Mellotron, Melodica, Piano, Synth
Dana Colley - Baritone, Bass Saxophone (Courtesy of Morphine)

External links 
 Band Website
 Kickstarter campaign

References 

2013 albums
Big D and the Kids Table albums
Kickstarter-funded albums